Bozeman, a city and the county seat of Gallatin County, Montana, United States.

Bozeman may refer to:
Bozeman (surname), includes a list of people with the name
Bozeman Pass, a mountain pass situated east of Bozeman, Montana
Bozeman Trail, an overland route connecting the gold rush territory of Montana to the Oregon Trail.